The Liber de Coquina ("The book of cooking/cookery") is one of the oldest medieval cookbooks. Two codices that contain the work survive from the beginning of the 14th century. Both are preserved at the Bibliothèque Nationale in Paris, France.

Description 
The text consists of two independent parts, mostly cited as Tractatus (part 1) and Liber de Coquina (part 2). The titles are taken from marginal notes by the medieval editor. While the identity of both the authors is unknown, it is believed that the Tractatus was originally written by a French author and the Liber de Coquina by an Italian author from the Naples area.

Contents

Tractatus (part 1) 
wine compositions
poultry and meat
fish
dishes for the rich
legumes, eggs, leeks and gravy

Liber de Coquina (part 2) 
vegetables
poultry
pastry
fish
compositions of many ingredients

Text

Manuscripts 
Latin manuscript 7131, fol. 94r-99v, Bibliothèque nationale, Paris (ca. 1304-1314)
Latin manuscript 9328, fol. 129r-139v, Bibliothèque nationale, Paris (14th century)

Text edition 
Marianne Mulon: "Deux traités inédits d'art culinaire médiéval", Bull. philol. et hist. année 1968, vol 1, p. 369-435

Digital versions 
The two parts are available at Thomas Gloning's site:

Tractatus de modo preparandi et condiendi omnia cibaria
 https://www.uni-giessen.de/de/fbz/fb05/germanistik/absprache/sprachverwendung/gloning/tx/mul1-tra.htm

Liber de coquina ubi diuersitates ciborum docentur
 https://www.uni-giessen.de/de/fbz/fb05/germanistik/absprache/sprachverwendung/gloning/tx/mul2-lib.htm

Translations 
Complete Latin-German edition:

Italian translation of the Tractatus:
Enrico Carnevale Schianca (ed.): "Tractatus de modo preparandi et condiendi omnia cibaria", Appunti di Gastronomia n. 26, Condeco s.r.l. Editore, Milano 1998

See also
 Medieval cuisine
Le Viandier – a recipe collection generally credited to Guillaume Tirel, c 1300
 The Forme of Cury – a royal collection of medieval English recipes of the 14th century, influenced by the Liber de Coquina
 Apicius – a collection of Roman cookery recipes

References 

Medieval cookbooks
13th-century Latin books
14th-century Latin books
Treatises